Gaius Marius "the Younger" (c. 110 – 82 BC) was a Roman republican general and politician who became consul in 82 BC with Papirius Carbo. He fought in Sulla's civil war. He committed suicide that same year at Praeneste, after his defeat by Sulla and during the city's capture by Quintus Lucretius Afella.

Biography

Marius the Younger was the son of the Gaius Marius who was seven times consul and a famous military commander.  His mother, Julia, was an aunt of Julius Caesar. In his youth, Marius was educated with Titus Pomponius Atticus and Marcus Tullius Cicero by Greek tutors. During the Social War, he served under Lucius Porcius Cato, which one source claims Marius killed at the Battle of Fucine Lake over Cato's claims that Cato's achievements were on par with the elder Marius's victory over the Cimbri. Seeking to strengthen his political alliances, the elder Marius married his son to Licinia, a daughter of Lucius Licinius Crassus.

Due to the political turmoil launched by his father in 88 BC to strip his rival Lucius Cornelius Sulla of command of the Roman forces in the First Mithridatic War, the younger Marius accompanied his father into exile when Sulla unexpectedly marched on Rome, forcing them both to flee. At Ostia, young Marius went on ahead of his father and sailed to Africa. There he went to the court of Hiempsal II of Numidia to seek his help against Sulla, but the king decided to hold him captive instead. He managed to escape with the help of one of Hiempsal's concubines whom the young Marius had seduced. He then joined up with his father who had also come to Africa, and they escaped to the Kerkennah Islands.

Learning of Cinna's fight to retain his consulship in 87 BC, father and son returned to Rome, where Marius the elder took control of the situation, gathering an army of slaves and gladiators, and murdering his enemies, both real and imagined. According to Cassius Dio, the younger Marius inaugurated his father's seventh consulship by murdering one plebeian tribune and sending his head to the newly installed consuls, while having another tribune thrown from the heights of the Capitoline Hill. He also banished two praetors, ordering that neither should receive fire or water from any Roman citizen. When his father died of natural causes shortly after taking office, the young Marius assumed leadership of his father's adherents and clients, although overall control of the Marian faction was held by Cinna, who was elected consul on consecutive years until his death in 84 BC. 

Marius minor was elected consul for 82 BC and deployed on the frontiers of Latium to oppose Sulla, who had conquered the southern part of Italy after landing in Brundisium the prior year. This was a political move by Gnaeus Papirius Carbo, his consular colleague and the new leader of the Marians after Cinna died, to drum up popular support and enthusiasm for the war against Sulla; Marius was much too young and had not held the prerequisite magistracies to be a legally elected consul. Two talented and better-qualified men among the Marian faction, his cousin Marius Gratidianus and Quintus Sertorius, were passed over in favor of the younger Marius "in the interest of unity". Many of the old veterans from the elder Marius's former armies came out of retirement and flocked to the younger Marius's side, and, by the battle of Sacriportus, his army numbered eighty-five cohorts.

At the Battle of Sacriportus, in 82 BC, Sulla and his army defeated the army of Marius. Marius with around 7,000 surviving troops retreated to the fortress city of Praeneste, along with the treasury of the Capitoline temple. Sulla's lieutenant Quintus Lucretius Afella, conducted the siege, 

After his defeat, Marius gave orders to allies in Rome to kill a number of Sullan supporters before Rome was captured by Sulla, including , the ex-consul Lucius Domitius, Publius Antistius and Gaius Carbo. Although both Gnaeus Papirius Carbo and Lucius Junius Brutus Damasippus attempted to break the siege, they were unsuccessful, with relief forces being intercepted and destroyed en route. After receiving news of Sulla's victory at the Battle of the Colline Gate, Marius made one final attempt to escape, this time by digging a tunnel under the walls, but the attempt was uncovered. Marius committed suicide so as not to fall into enemy hands.

In 45 BC, a man referred to as Pseudo-Marius appeared in Rome, claiming to be the son of the younger Marius.

Notes

References

Sources

 
 
 
 
 

1st-century BC births
82 BC deaths
1st-century BC Roman consuls
Ancient Roman generals
Ancient Roman outlaws
Ancient Romans who committed suicide
Gaius the Younger
Populares
Year of birth uncertain